The Port of Skadovsk is located in Skadovsk on the northern shores of Dzharylhach Bay, which is protected from the open seas by island of Dzharylhach. The port operates all year around.

History 
On 11 December 2015 a new ferry route opened with Istanbul, Turkey. The ferry connection became possible after withdrawal of a Russian monopolist from the region soon after the annexation of Crimea by Russia in 2014. With government funding, the Port of Skadovsk was able to deepen the sea floor and rebuild wharfs. This ferry connection cost Ukraine ₴3,000,000 (US$200,000).

See also 

 List of ports in Ukraine

References

External links
 Sea Ports of Ukraine Administration website

Ports of Kherson Oblast
1894 establishments in the Russian Empire
Ports and harbours of the Black Sea
Ukrainian Sea Ports Authority